The U.M. Rose School is a historic school building at the corner of Izard and West 13th Streets, on the campus of Philander Smith College in Little Rock, Arkansas.  A two-story U-shaped Colonial Revival brick building, it was built in 1915 to a design by Arkansas architect Charles L. Thompson, and was called "by far the best constructed" of any building in Little Rock.

It served the city as a primary school for many years.  It is now known as the James M. Cox Administration Building, and houses the college's administrative offices.

The school is named after U. M. Rose, a prominent lawyer and judge.

The building was listed on the National Register of Historic Places in 1988.

See also
National Register of Historic Places listings in Little Rock, Arkansas

References

School buildings on the National Register of Historic Places in Arkansas
Colonial Revival architecture in Arkansas
School buildings completed in 1915
Buildings and structures in Little Rock, Arkansas
National Register of Historic Places in Little Rock, Arkansas
Historic district contributing properties in Arkansas
1915 establishments in Arkansas